The United Arab Emirates national badminton team represents the United Arab Emirates in international badminton team competitions. The national team is controlled by the United Arab Emirates Badminton Federation, the governing body for badminton in the United Arab Emirates.

Participation in Badminton Asia Team Championships
Mixed team

Current squad 

Men
Bharath Latheesh
Dev Ayyappan
Dhiren Ayyappan
Dev Vishnu
Hamid Almazrouei
Rishabh Kalidasan
Nasser Alsayegh
Riyan Malhan

Women
Maryam Alblooshi
Ghadeer Ali Altahri
Sanika Dhawan Gurav
Taabia Khan
Aleena Qathun
Akansha Raj
Nayonika Rajesh
Madhumitha Sundarapandian

References

Badminton
National badminton teams
Badminton in the United Arab Emirates